Lysimachia lichiangensis is a perennial herb, 35–75 cm in height, native to western Sichuan and north Yunnan, China.

References

 Notes Roy. Bot. Gard. Edinburgh 4(19): 237-238 237 1908.

lichiangensis